Nay Varanbhat Loncha Kon Nay Koncha is a 2022 Indian Marathi-language crime film written, directed by Mahesh Manjrekar and produced by Shreyans Hirawat under the banner of NH Studioz. It was theatrically released on 14 January 2022.

Plot 
The story revolves around two adolescent boys who are exposed to many sensitive issues like sex, crime, murder at their young age which results in impacting their personalities.

Cast 

 Prem Dharmadhikari as Digya 
 Rohit Haldikar as Shirya
 Nupur Dudhwadkar as Yakub 
 Shashank Shende as Babi
 Savita Malpekar as Babi's wife
 Chhaya Kadam as Bay Bikaji Chalke 
 Ganesh Yadav as Bhaktya
 Dhananjay Mandrekar as Inspector 
 Umesh Jagtap as Shantya Gawade 
 Atul Kale as Mahadev Bikaji Chalke 
 Kashmera Shah as Supriya 
 Ganesh Revdekar as Gupta 
 Ashwini Kulkarni as Kaki

Reception

Critical reception 

Film received Mixed reviews from critics. Kalpeshraj Kubal of Maharashtra Times rate 3.5 out of five and wrote "The first half of the movie drags a bit.  But, the second half picks up speed.  Child actors Prem Dharmadhikari and Varad Nagvekar have effectively portrayed the sentiments of Digya and Iliyas on screen. The directorial handling of their roles, dialogues have a big contribution in it.  Chhaya Kadam, who is playing the role of Baye, has left us speechless with her acting skills.  His body language and verbal interactions add to the height of the role.Cinematography and soundtrack of the film is much impressive. Nay Varanbhat Loncha Kon Nay Koncha, its scenes are very dark and inflammatory;  It brings a kind of sadness.  But the commentary from it is very important.

Mihir Bhanage of Entertainment Times gave 2.5 out of five and wrote "The film takes a Quentin Tarantino-like approach, not just in terms of content and violence, but also with the non-linear treatment it gets. But it reveals more than its able to hide making story predictable.

Controversy 

The chairperson of National Commission for Women (NCW) has written to the Ministry of Information and Broadcasting (I&B) to censor the trailer of the film. In a statement, NCW said it had received a complaint from Bharatiya Stree Shakti that the film's trailer contained content that 'depicted women and minors in an offensive manner'.

References

External links 

  
 Nay Varanbhat Loncha Kon Nay Koncha at Rotten Tomatoes

Indian crime thriller films
2022 films
Indian crime drama films
2020s Marathi-language films